Meet Joe Mac is Joey McIntyre's second studio album, released on May 15, 2001 by Atlantic Records. The album spawned only one single: "Rain".

Track listing 
All songs co-written by Joey McIntyre, except "Love Song".

Personnel
Adapted from the Meet Joe Mac booklet.

Vocals

 Joey McIntyre – lead and background vocals 
 Fred Schneider – guest vocals 
 Spiro Phanos – additional vocals 
 Li'l Al Jacob – additional vocals 
 Steffanie Beard – NYC Girl 
 Heather Loven – NYC Girl 
 Katie Stark – NYC Girl 
 Everett Bradley – background vocals 
 Tabitha Fair – background vocals 
 Skyler Jett – background vocals 
 Georgia Jones – background vocals 
 Emanuel Kiriakou – background vocals 
 John Mandeville – background vocals 
 Claytoven Richardson – background vocals 
 Mary Wood – background vocals 
 Lucy Woodward – background vocals 
 Craig Young – background vocals 

Instrumentation

 Walter Afanasieff – bass, Hammond B-3 
 Greg Bieck – piano, synthesizers 
 Sterling Campbell – drums 
 John Catchings – cello 
 George "Coach" Coccini – guitar 
 Chris Collins – guitars 
 Charley Drayton – bass , drums 
 Lisa Kim – violin 
 Emanuel Kiriakou – guitars , bass , Bouzouki , percussion , piano 
 Liz Knowles – fiddle 
 Jerry O'Sullivan – uilleann pipes 
 Sandra Park – violin 
 Doug Petty – keyboards 
 Mark Plati – acoustic guitar , bass , keyboards 
 Robert Rinehart – viola 
 Scot Sax – guitar 
 Earl Slick – guitar 
 Alan Stepansky – cello 
 Michael Urbano – drums 
 John Whelm – accordion 
 Craig Young – acoustic guitar, bass, distorto slide bass, drums, percussion 

Technical

 Greg Bieck – production, arrangement, drum programming 
 Emanuel Kiriakou – production, engineering 
 Mark Plati – production, engineering, mixing 
 Craig Young – production, engineering 
 Joey McIntyre – production 
 Scot Sax – production 
 Pat Thrall – additional production , engineering , mixing 
 Hector Castillo – production assistant 
 Li'l Al Jacob – production assistant 
 David Gleeson – engineering 
 John Carter – engineering 
 Kevin Killen – engineering 
 Michael Ungerer – engineering 
 Justin Fraser – additional engineering 
 Larry Brooks – assistant engineering 
 Peter Krawiec – assistant engineering 
 David Reitzas – mixing 
 Jean-Marie Horvat – mixing 
 Kevin Shirley – mixing 
 Neil Dorfsman – mixing 
 F. Reid Shippen – mixing 
 Rob Worthington – mix assistant 
 Greg Calbi – mastering

Imagery
 Goldie Gareza – art direction and design, additional photography
 Jana Leon – photography
 Susan Schacter – additional photography

References

2001 albums
Joey McIntyre albums
Atlantic Records albums
Albums produced by Emanuel Kiriakou